Amine Mehdi Oudrhiri Idrissi (born 4 November 1992) is a French professional footballer who plays as a midfielder for Primeira Liga club Rio Ave

Career
After spending time in the semi-professional leagues, Oudrhiri joined Nantes in 2013. He was loaned out for half a season to Arles-Avignon in February 2015 where he made his full professional debut the same month, in a 1–0 Ligue 2 defeat against Nîmes. On 28 August 2015, he again went on loan, this time for a whole season, to Sedan.

Personal life
Born in France, Oudrhiri is of Moroccan descent.

References

External links
 
 
 Amine Oudrhiri foot-national.com Profile

Living people
1992 births
People from Ermont
Footballers from Val-d'Oise
French footballers
French sportspeople of Moroccan descent
Association football midfielders
Ligue 2 players
Red Star F.C. players
Championnat National players
AC Arlésien players
CS Sedan Ardennes players
Leixões S.C. players
S.C. Farense players
Rio Ave F.C. players
Primeira Liga players
Liga Portugal 2 players
French expatriate footballers
Expatriate footballers in Portugal

Moroccan expatriate sportspeople in Portugal